Cantan Corridos is the first collaborative album released in 1979 by the New Mexican musicians Al Hurricane and Al Hurricane, Jr. The album is not the first time Al and his son performed together, they had appeared together on the Val De La O Show. It is the eighth full-length album released by Al Hurricane.

Track listing

References

Al Hurricane albums
New Mexico music albums